Namkha (Tibetan: ནམ་མཁའ་ nam mkha'  "sky", "space", "aether"," heaven"), also known as Dö; (Tibetan mdos (མདོས) ) is a form of yarn or thread cross composed traditionally of wool or silk and is a form of the Endless knot of the Eight Auspicious Symbols (Ashtamangala).

Namkha, space, is the Tibetan name of an extremely ancient structure made of coloured threads wrapped around wooden sticks, variations of which can be found in other traditions of the populations of our planet, which from time immemorial, Tibetans have imbued with a very precise, well defined and meaningful function, as we shall see from the pure symbolic representation.

Used in the ancient rituals of Bön — the pre-Buddhist religion of Tibet — in reality this object represents the fundamental components and aspects of the energy of the individual, as defined from the conception until the birth of the individual.

Knowledge about the use of Namkha were almost completely lost, but in 1983 Chögyal Namkhai Norbu wrote a text entitled The Preparation of Namkha which Harmonizes the Energy of the Elements, and in the same year gave oral teachings on Namkha explaining that its function is to harmonize the elements of the individual and the various forms of energy related to them.

Faithful to the meaning of space, both as origin and of indispensable support of the five material elements, Wood, Fire, Earth, Metal and Water, the Namkha as a whole represents the global space in which these interact. But whilst being founded on astrological calculations, and in fact certainly not being able to do without them, a Namkha is not at all the equivalent of a three dimensional horoscope. It is not limited to a mere representation of the elements of the individual, but possesses a function, not just cognitive but operative. It is in fact a concrete, effective and extraordinary means to harmonize the energy of the individual, both internally and in relation to the total energy of the time and the universe as a whole.

In certain tantric rituals, the Namkha becomes a pure land abode of a deity while in other rites it may act as a snare for demons. Tradition holds that it was for this latter purpose that a namkha  was used by Padmasambhava after his Vajrakilaya Dance during the consecration of Samye monastery during the first importation of Buddhism to Tibet. (Pearlman, 2002: p. 18).   Weavings of a similar nature are called "God's eye" in English folk art.

In the Bön and Vajrayana Buddhist traditions, a namkha is constructed as the temporary dwelling for a deity during ritual practice. The structure of the namkha is traditionally made with colored threads symbolic of the elements (blue, green, red, white, and yellow; space, air, fire, water, and earth respectively ), the sequence, and the shape of the namkha differing for each particular deity or yidam. The namkha is placed on the practitioner's altar or shrine and an image of the deity may be placed beneath. The namkha is often accompanied in rites and ritual workings with the tantric and shamanic tool, the phurba. Pearlman (2002: p. 18) states how Padmasambhava consecrated the land for the building of Samye Monastery by the enactment of the rite of the Vajrakilaya dance which employed namkha to capture malevolent spirits and thoughtforms.

Ngak’chang Rinpoche comments:  "These threads symbolise the ‘thread’ that is the literal meaning of the word ‘tantra’ and describe the manner in which each point in time and space is the warp and weft of the loom of experiential / existential emptiness."

See also 
 Khorlo
 Prayer flag
 Weaving (mythology)

Notes

References 
 Namkhai Norbu (1999). Namkha , Shang Shung Edizioni.
 Giuseppe Tucci (1980). The Religions of Tibet, translated by Geoffrey Samuel. London: Routledge & Kegan Paul.
 Beer, Robert (1999). The Encyclopedia of Tibetan Symbols and Motifs (Hardcover). Shambhala Publications. 
 Beyer, Stephen (1978). The Cult of Tara: Magic and Ritual in Tibet, University of California Press.
 
 Müller-Ebeling, Claudia and Christian Rätsch and Surendra Bahadur Shahi (2002). Shamanism  and Tantra in the Himalayas. Transl. by Annabel Lee. Rochester, Vt.: Inner Traditions International.
  Nebesky-Wojkowitz, Rene de. Oracles and Demons of Tibet, pgs 369-397. 
  Nebesky-Wojkowitz, Rene de (1976). Tibetan Religious Dances. The Hague: Mouton.
 Pearlman, Ellen (2002). Tibetan Sacred Dance:  a journey into the religious and folk traditions. Rochester, Vermont, USA:  Inner Traditions.  
 Tsogyel, Yeshe. The Life and Liberation of Padmasambhava, 2 vols., trans. Kenneth Douglas and Gwendolyn Bays (Berkeley:  Dharma Publishing, 1978)
 https://namkha-encyclopedia.com/ Website that outlines how to make Namkha by the Chögyal Namkhai Norbu method.

Buddhist ritual implements
Buddhist symbols
Tibetan Buddhist practices